Dr. Paruchuri Gopala Krishna is an Indian film screenwriter, story writer, dialogue writer, actor, director, poet, playwright, novelist, and orator predominant in Telugu cinema. Dr. Gopala Krishna is the younger of the Paruchuri Brothers (Paruchuri Venkateswara Rao and Dr. Paruchuri Gopala Krishna), a writing duo in the film industry who have worked on more than 350 films (including Telugu, Tamil, Hindi, and Kannada) since 1978.

Early life and education

Dr. Paruchuri Gopala Krishna (born 10 June 1946 in Meduru, Gannavaram Taluq, Krishna District) was the youngest child of his parents Paruchuri Raghaviah and Hymavathamma. He has one elder sister and two elder brothers Paruchuri Venkateswara Rao and Paruchuri Kutumba Rao.

Dr. Gopala Krishna received his BSc from the Government City Science College and an MA Telugu from the Arts College, both affiliated with Osmania University. Later he earned his PhD from Osmania University in Telugu Cinema Literature, concentrating on the research topic: ‘Telugu Cinema Sahityam – Katha- Kathanam – Silpam’ in the year 2003. Dr. Gopala Krishna earned Doctor of Literature from Berhampur University, Orissa for the research topic: ‘Telugu Cinema Story – Social Outlook’ in the year 2021. He has also done ‘Rashtra Bhasha’ in Hindi. He is fluent in Hindi, English and is familiar with Tamil.

Personal life
Dr. Gopala Krishna is married to his first cousin, Vijaya Lakshmi. The couple has three children, Paruchuri Hima Bindu, Gottimukkala Naga Sushma who is married to TV and Film Artist, Gottimukkala Jaya Prakash (Screen name Varun) and Kodali Hari Priya who is married to entrepreneur, Kodali Kalyan Prasad.

Career

Lecturer, Head of the Department and Vice Principal (1975–1983)
Dr. Gopala Krishna worked as a Telugu lecturer at Lal Bahdoor Shastri Oriental College, Chinanindra Kolanu, West Godavari from 7 August 1971 to 1 September 1975. Later, he worked as the Head of the Department of Telugu and Vice Principal in Adusumilli Gopala Krishna & Sugar Cane Growers College, Vuyyuru, Krishna District from 2 September 1975 to April 1983.

Writing and acting (1971–present)

Initially, he started writing small stories, playlets and detective novels which were published in weekly magazines. He acted in more than one hundred playlets in Indian theater. In 1978, his brother Paruchuri Venkateswara Rao, who was already in the film industry, advised Gopala Krishna to join him in film writing.  As a result, they both started scripting the films as Paruchuri Venkateswara Rao and Paruchuri Gopala Krishna. In 1982, Sri. Nandamuri Taraka Rama Rao proposed the screen name Paruchuri Brothers and since then the writing-duo have been established as successful writers. In 1983, Dr. Gopala Krishna first starred in the film Ee Piilaku Pellavuthunda, for which the Paruchuri brothers wrote the storyline and dialogues. He continued to appear in 47 films as an artist and also continued writing for more than 350 films; to name a few E Charithra Ye Siraatho, Naa Desam, Khaidi, Eenadu, Mundadugu, Bobbili Brahmanna, Prajaswamyam, Karthavyam, Varsham, Sarpayagam, Major Chandrakanth Samarasimha Reddy, Narasimha Naidu, Okkadu, Indra, Tagore, Manasantha Nuvve, Nee Sneham, Nuvvostanante Nenoddantana, Shankardada MBBS, Drushyam, Khaidi No. 150, Rudrama Devi and Sye Raa Narasimha Reddy.

Direction (1984–present)
In 1984, both the brothers decided to direct film. Their first film as directors, under Srinadh movies, was Kai Raja Kai. Later they directed a total of 9 films, Bhale Thammudu, Sreekrishnaleelalu, Repati Swarajyam, Praja Swamyamyam, Maa Telugu Talli, Maro Quit India, Sarpayagam and Singanna.

Other work

Television
Dr. Gopala Krishna contributed his services to television as a host, co-host, actor, writer, and director. He hosted the Gemini TV reality show Chilaka Gorinka in 1996. He then hosted 200 episodes of Praja Vedika—a Gemini TV talk show from 2008 to 2013. He also co-hosted the Maa TV reality show Andhamina Jeevitham in 2015 and the Maa TV reality show Samsaram oka Chadarangam in 2016.
In 2001, he scripted Mattimanishi, an ETV tele serial for Sri. Akkineni Nageswara Rao. In 2013, he directed Sati Savitri, an ETV mythological tele film. In the year 2004, he acted in Thulabharam, a ZEE Telugu tele film and in 2013 he acted as Neelakanta Sastri in Yogi Vemana historical serial which telecasted in ABN.

Mentor
Dr. Gopala Krishna always had a passion for teaching and continues to be an Hon. Professor and has conducted screenplay classes at Potti Sreeramulu Telugu University, Telugu Cine Writers Association and Telugu Film Directors Association since 2008.

Social media
In 2017, he began sharing his knowledge by teaching film script writing classes through his YouTube channel (#ParuchuriPalukulu and #ParuchurPaataalu) for all aspiring writers.  These interactive lessons are shared on his other social media accounts, like Facebook and Twitter.

Services
 Served as the chairman for "Official Language Commission", Andhra Pradesh from Feb 2003 to May 2004
 Served as an Executive Council Member from 1997 to 2005 for "Potti Sreeramulu Telugu University"
 Served as an Executive Council Member in 2002 for "Movie Artist Association (MAA)"
 Served as a Director from 2002 to 2004 for "Film Development Corporation", Andhra Pradesh
 Served as a Honorable President for "A.P. Film Industry Employees Federation" in 2002
 Served as a Honorable President from 2008 to 2010 for "A.P. Film Industry Employees Federation"
 Served as a Co-ordination Committee chairman, "A.P. Film Industry Employees Federation" in 2012
 Served as a Co-ordination Committee chairman from 2008 to 2010 for "A.P. Film Directors Association"
 Served as a Judge for "A.P. State Nandi Drama Competition" in 2006
 Served as a "Hamsa and Ugadi Purskara Selection Committee member" in 2015
 Continues to serve as Honorable Professor, "Sri Potti Sreeramulu Telugu University" since 2008
 Continues to serve as the Co-Ordination Committee chairman, "Movie Artist Association (MAA)" since 2010
 Continues to serve as the President of "Telugu Cine Writers Association" since 2007
 Continues to serve as the Life Member to "Tyagaraya Ganasabha" since 1991
 Continues to serve as Convener and Trustee to the "Paruchuri Raghubabu Memorial Trust" since 1991
 Continues to serve as the chairman to the "Smt. Paruchuri Hymavathy Raghaviah Memorial Trust" since 2012
 Continues to serve as Chief Advisor of "Shri Rajarajeswari Devi Temple", Film nagar, Hyderabad since 1998
 Serving as General Secretary to "Film Nagar Daiva Sannidhanam" trust board (Affiliated to 'VISAKHA SRI SARADAPEETHAM'), Hyderabad since 2018

Literary

Literary essays
 In 1997, on 1 and 22 September, "Stree Patralu" and "Samagica Prabhavam" published in "Andhra Jyothi" daily.
 From Nov. 95 to Jan. 97, "Chitramlo Citralu" essay published in "Rachana" monthly.

Literary books
 Telugu Cinema Sahityam – "Katha-Kathanam-Silpam"(Eighth Edition running)
 "11th Hour"(Third Edition running)
 "Memu ‘Maa’ Herolu" (First Edition running)

Novels
 Bharatakhandam Bhaggumantondi (Andhra Bhoomi Weekly)
 Nallapusalu (Andhra Jyothi Weekly)
 Asambhavami Yuge Yuge (Udayam Weekly)
 Strinam.... Buddhischapi Charturgunaha (Andhra Prabha Weekly)

Playlets
 Socialism in 1971
 Patta Bhadrula Phalaharasala in 1979
 Ee Charitra Erra Siratho in 1980
 Ariche Kukka Karicindi in 1995 TANA festival at USA in Chicago and Detroit
 Telugu Vijayam in 2007 TANA festival at USA in Washington DC and L.A., enacted by Sri. Nandamuri Balakrishna
 Sambhavami Pade Pade in 2009
 Budhhim Saranam Gachhami in 2010
 Raja Raja Narendrudu in 2011 TANA festival at USA in Santa Clara, L.A. and Dallas, enacted by Sri. Nandamuri Balakrishna
 Sri Krishna Vuvacha and Dabba Palu in 2012 Prapancha Telugu Mahasabhalu in Tirupathi
 Revised version of Dabba Palu in 2013 TANA festival at USA in Dallas
 Bhuvana Vijayam in 2016 at Lepakshi Utsav, Hindupur, enacted by Sri. Nandamuri Balakrishna

Short stories and essays
 First short story Vidheyadu in Swathi monthly in January 1975
 Kukka Viswasamgala Janthuvu and Vimananam Noruleni Yantram short stories in Hasam weekly
 11th Hour Episodes on Cinema in Andhra Jyothi Daily from July 2004 to Dec. 2004
 Memu Maa Herolu ‘Hrudya lekhanam’ in Super Hit Film Magazine in 2004–2005

Awards, honors and recognitions

Best Story Writer
 Second Best Story Writer in 1986 for Pratidhwani, A.P. State Nandi Award
 Best Story Writer in 1990 for Karthavyam, A.P. State Nandi Award
 Best Story Writer in 1990 for Karthavyam, Kalasagar, Madras
 Best Story Writer in 1993 for Aasayam, A.P. State Nandi Award
 Best Story Writer in 1993 for Aasayam, Cinegoers association, Hyderabad
 Best Screenplay Writer in 1990 for Kodama Simham, Vamsi Berkley Awards

Best Dialogue Writer
 1982 Eenadu Sitara Award, Hyderabad
 1988 Prajaswamyam, Rasamayi, Tenali
 1990 Karthavyam, Kala Sagar Award, Madras
 1991 People's Encounter, Kala Sagar, Madras
 1992 Sundarakanda, Lalita Kala Sagar, Chittoor
 1992 Peddarikam, Lyrics Award, Madras
 1993 Kunthi Puthrudu, Vamsi Berkley Award, Hyderabad
 1993 Major Chandrakanth, Kalasagar, Madras
 1996 Nayudugari Kutumbam, A.P. State Nandi Award
 1998 Ganesh, A.P. State Nandi Award
 1998 Ganesh, A.P. Cinegoers Award
 1998 Bavagaru Bagunnara, Vamsi Berkley Award
 1999 Samarasimha Reddy, AFJA Award
 1999 Samarasimha Reddy, Yuvakala Vahini Award
 1999 Samarasimha Reddy, A.P. Cinegoers Award
 2000 Azad, A.P. Cinegoers Award
 2001 Narasimha Naidu, Vamsi Directors Specials
 2002 Indra, A.P. Cinegoers Award
 2003 Tagore, A.P. Cinegoers Award
 2003 Tagore, Santosham Award
 2003 Tagore, Maa T.V. Award
 2003 Tagore, Bharatha Muni Award
 2004 Varsham, Santhosham Award
 2004 Sankardada MBBS, MAA T.V. Award
 2005 Suryam, Vamsi Berkley Award
 2006 Stalin, Santhosham Award

Best Film Director
 Third Best Film Director in 1987 for Prajaswamyam, A.P. State Nandi Award

Special Jury Award
 Paruchuri Brothers were awarded with Special Jury Award for the year 2016, A.P. State Nandi Award

TV Awards
 Best Playlet writer award in A.P. State Nandi Drama Competition for the playlet "Sambhavami Pade Pade" in 2009
 Best Villain in comedy role for Sasirekha Parinayam movie in 2010, Gemini TV Film Awards
 Best Social Program Presenter award received for "Prajavedika" in 2011, Padmamohana TV awards
 Best Talk Show award for "Praja Vedika" in 2012, Gemini TV Awards
 Best Anchor award for "Praja Vedika" in 2012, Yuvakala Vahini
 Best Director award for Tele film "Sati Savitri" in 2014, Aradhana srikari ETV (Telecasted in 2013)
 Second Best Tele Film "Sathi Savithri", Copper Nandi and Commendation certificate to the director award for 2013 given in 2017 by AP State Government.

Honors and felicitations
 Celebrate award in 2007 at "Telugu Chalana Chitra Vajrotsavam" (Diamond Jubilee)
  "Sensational Star Writers of the Decade" Award by Super Hit Magazine in 2010
 "Tv9 TSR Lalitha Kala Parishat" Best Story Dialogue Writers Award in 2010
 "Vishala Bharati Gaurav Satkar" award by Delhi Telugu Academy in 2007 for Script Writing
 "NTR Smaraka Purskara" Award for Contribution towards cinema in 2011, Hyderabad
 For completion of 200 films with the title ‘’’200 Not Out’’’ in 1992 at Ravindra Bharathi, Hyderabad
 For completing ‘’’Silver Jubilee’’’ in film writing successfully by "Singapore Telugu Association", Singapore in 2002
 For completing 25 years in film writing successfully by "TANA (Telugu Association of North America)" at San Jose, USA in 2003
 For completing 25 years in film writing successfully by "ETA (European Telugu Association)" at Birmingham, UK in 2003
 Aatreya Award title by "Abhinandhana Cultural Association"
  Visista Sodharulu title by "Padma Mohana" in 2004
  Visista Dampatulu title by "Padma Mohana" in 2009
  Gangi Reddy Memorial International Spiritual Award, Vishakapatnam in 2009
 Viswa Vikhyata Rachana Sarwabhoumulu title (Birudu) by "T. Subba Rami Reddy Lalitha Kala Parishath" on the occasion of completing 333 films in 33 years for 3 Generations in 2011
 100 years of SIFCC (South India Film Centenary Celebrations) film festival at Chennai in 2013
  Dr. Allu Ramalingaiah National Award at Vijayawada in 2014
 Dasari Smarakam Writer Award by Santotsham at 15th Santosham Film Awards in 2017
 Life Time Achievement Award by Kakatiya Kala Sevasamithi, Hyderabad in 2017
TAAI Award In recognition of services to Telugu Language by Telugu Association of Australia, Melbourne in 2017
 Life Time Achievement Award by Telugu Association Inc, Sydney in 2017

Filmography

As director

As artist

As writers

References

External links
 

Living people
People from Krishna district
Indian screenwriting duos
Screenwriters from Andhra Pradesh
Indian male screenwriters
20th-century Indian dramatists and playwrights
21st-century Indian dramatists and playwrights
20th-century Indian male writers
21st-century Indian male writers
Year of birth missing (living people)
Santosham Film Awards winners
People from Vijayawada
Indian screenwriters
Telugu screenwriters
Male actors in Telugu cinema
Male actors from Andhra Pradesh
Male actors from Vijayawada